In physics, the Einstein–Hopf drag (named after Albert Einstein and Ludwig Hopf) is a velocity-dependent drag force upon charged particles that are being bathed in thermal radiation.

References

Further reading 
 
 
 
 
 

Drag (physics)
Electrical phenomena